007: Quantum of Solace is a 2008 first-person shooter (third-person shooter for Nintendo DS and PlayStation 2) video game based on the films Casino Royale and Quantum of Solace. Developed by Treyarch for PlayStation 3, Xbox 360, Wii and PC (additional porting by Beenox), Eurocom for PlayStation 2 and Vicarious Visions for the Nintendo DS, the game was the first James Bond video game to be published by Activision, who gained the Bond licence from EA in 2006. The game was also the first to feature Daniel Craig's voice and likeness, as well as those of Judi Dench, Eva Green, Mads Mikkelsen, Olga Kurylenko and Mathieu Amalric.

The game was released on October 31, 2008 in Europe, November 4, 2008 in North America, and November 19, 2008 in Australia. The game received generally mixed reviews from critics, with the PlayStation 2 version receiving the best reviews.

Plot
The game begins with James Bond kidnapping Mr. White, a member of the previously unknown criminal-terrorist organization Quantum. While he and M interrogate White, they are attacked by the traitorous MI6 agent Henry Mitchell, who is killed by Bond while White escapes. Later, Bond spies on a meeting of Quantum members and photographs them; among them is Dominic Greene, a well-known environmentalist.

The game jumps forward to Bond crashlanding in Bolivia, where Greene is trying to buy land. By this time, Bond has met Camille Montes who is seeking vengeance against General Medrano, who is trying to overthrow the Bolivian government. Bond learns that Medrano killed Camille's family, and this is why she wants revenge. Bond opens up to Camille about the death of his former lover Vesper Lynd, recounting the events of Casino Royale. The player follows through the plot of Casino Royale, from Bond chasing Mollaka through Madagascar, Bond infiltrating the Science Center to kill Dimitrios, saving Skyfleet from Carlos, killing Bliss en route to Montenegro, meeting Vesper, saving Le Chiffre from Steven Obanno and his men, saving Vesper from Le Chiffre, and finally confronting Vesper and Gettler in Venice where Vesper dies, at which point it flashes back to the present.

Bond and Camille soon arrive at a hotel in the middle of the Bolivian desert. There, Greene and Medrano are discussing the land that Greene wants to buy; Greene will fund Medrano's attempt to overthrow the government in exchange for the land that he wants. Bond and Camille break up the meeting; Camille then kills Medrano while Bond kills Greene. During the fight, the hotel's fuel cells are ignited; Bond and Camille manage to escape from the hotel before it explodes. They leave the area in an MI6 helicopter. In the closing scene, it is revealed that Mr. White and Guy Haines are looking at MI6 debriefings and updates on 007's missions. The game ends with a scene of Bond outside the house telling M that he's going in.

Gameplay

PlayStation 3, Xbox 360, Wii and PC
The seventh-gen version of the game is a first-person shooter, similar to other games like Call of Duty (also developed by Treyarch, using a modified version of the IW game engine that was used for Call of Duty games at the time), but the game switches to third-person when taking cover, as well as featuring additional takedown mechanics and quick-time events. The Wii version of the game features controls tailored towards its Wii Remote controller, and features split screen offline multiplayer with up to 4-players, which the other versions lack.

PlayStation 2
The PlayStation 2 version of the game, developed by Eurocom, is an over-the-shoulder third-person shooter, much like a previous Bond game 007: Everything or Nothing. This version excludes the missions set in Miami airport, on the train and in Venice, but it adds a new mission set in the docks, and all levels feature slightly different level designs compared to the seventh-gen versions. This version also features no multiplayer, both online and offline.

Nintendo DS
The DS version of the game is designed differently from its console counterparts. The game is played with the DS held sideways and is in the third person. Bond's movements are controlled by dragging the stylus around the touchscreen. Actions (such as firing a weapon) are performed by pressing icons on the touchscreen, while the DS's buttons are relegated to primarily initiating hand-to-hand combat. There are 6 weapons in this version. The storyline followed by the DS version is also different. The character of Camille is cut altogether, the opening mission at White's Estate is replaced by a training simulation at MI6 Headquarters and, after fighting street gangs in Bolivia, the final mission and boss fights against Greene and Mr. White take place at Guy Haines' Mansion. Like the PS2 version, the DS version has no multiplayer.

Multiplayer

PlayStation 3, Xbox 360 and PC
 Bond Versus: One Bond plays against six other members of the 'Organization'. Bond will win if he defuses two of the three bombs, or else eliminates every member of the Organization. To make the game fairer Bond has two lives, can see all enemies, and can use any weapon set (whereas the members of the Organization have only 3 basic options). The Organization wins if Bond dies twice or if he cannot defuse two bombs in the time limit.
 Team Conflict: Basic Team Deathmatch of MI6 versus the 'Organization'.
 Golden Gun: This is a standard free-for-all conflict, which the main aim is to score 100 points. One point is scored for a kill with normal weapons, or for picking up the Golden Gun, while kills while holding the Golden Gun (or killing the person with it) scores 6. The winner is the first to score 100 points or the highest number of points in the allotted time limit.
 Bond Evasion: There are two teams, MI6 and The Organization. One player from the MI6 team is randomly designated as Bond, and therefore as the VIP. MI6 wins the round if Bond can get to the escape point, or if all of the Organization are eliminated. The Organization wins if Bond is prevented from escaping within the time limit, or if he dies.
 Territory Control: Basic match of one team having to control a point to gain points for their team.
 Classic: Players starts with a GF 18 A (Glock 18). Weapons and explosives are spawned around the level for them to pick up.

When playing in Multiplayer, credits are earned based on the number of points acquired. These are used, in a currency format, to purchase further enhancements and upgrades. These can be spent on unlocking new weapons, explosives, gadgets (such as increased health or better accuracy) and attachments for weapons. The upgrades can be accumulated in any order, instead of in a set order, and are able to stack.

Wii
 Conflict: This is a death-match. Up to four players compete versus each other to score as many kills as possible in a selectable number of minutes.
 Rush: This is a mission death-match. All players (up to four) are against each other and are assigned certain missions to complete in a selectable number of minutes.
 Team Conflict: The goal is to get the most kills for the player team (Organization versus MI-6). The teams can be constructed in any way (3 vs 1, 2 vs 2, 4 vs 0, in a four-player match). There is a time limit of 15 minutes.
 Team Rush: This is a team play game. The goal is to do specific missions before the other team does, all while staying alive. 15 minutes is the time limit.

The Wii's ranking system is the same as Mario Kart Wiis online. Players start at 5000 points and can gain or lose points depending on how well they played. The 5000 points are separate for each game mode, for example, A player can have 5350 points in Conflict, and have 5000 points in Rush or Team Rush.

Music
The music for the game was written by composer Christopher Lennertz, who recorded the strings for his score overseas, but then recorded brass, percussion, and guitar with members of the Hollywood Studio Symphony in Los Angeles at the Capitol Records Studios. The game features a different theme song from that of the film, "When Nobody Loves You" (written by Richard Fortus and Kerli; performed by Fortus, Kerli, and David Maurice; produced and arranged by David Maurice). The song plays over an opening title sequence in the Bond tradition that is proprietary to the game but is based on the (pre-credits) car chase sequence from the film.

Reception

007: Quantum of Solace received mixed reviews. Aggregating review websites GameRankings and Metacritic gave the PlayStation 2 version 76.50% and 73/100, the Xbox 360 version 68.73% and 65/100, the PC version 68.50% and 70/100, the PlayStation 3 version 67.17% and 65/100, the Nintendo DS version 63.00% and 65/100 and the Wii version 54.55% and 54/100.

References

External links
 007: Quantum of Solace at MobyGames

2008 video games
Activision games
Beenox games
Casino Royale (2006 film)
Eurocom games
First-person shooters
Games for Windows certified games
James Bond video games
MGM Interactive games
Multiplayer and single-player video games
Nintendo DS games
Nintendo Wi-Fi Connection games
PlayStation 2 games
PlayStation 3 games
Video game
Split-screen multiplayer games
Third-person shooters
Treyarch games
Video games based on films
Video games set in 2006
Video games set in 2008
Video games developed in Canada
Video games developed in the United Kingdom
Video games scored by Christopher Lennertz
Video games set in Austria
Video games set in Bolivia
Video games set in Italy
Video games set in Montenegro
Video games set in the United States
Video games set in Venice
Wii Wi-Fi games
Wii Zapper games
Windows games
Xbox 360 games
Vicarious Visions games
Video games developed in the United States